Arnold Sowinski (17 March 1931 – 2 April 2020) was a French footballer who played with RC Lens. He also managed RC Lens on four occasions.

Personal life
Sowinski was born in France and was of Polish descent.

Sowinski died of COVID-19 during the COVID-19 pandemic in France.

References

External links
Profile

1931 births
2020 deaths
French footballers
French people of Polish descent
RC Lens players
Ligue 1 players
French football managers
RC Lens managers
Association football goalkeepers
Deaths from the COVID-19 pandemic in France
People from Liévin
Footballers from Hauts-de-France
Sportspeople from Pas-de-Calais